William (Bill) S. Hammack (born 1961) is an American chemical engineer, and Professor in the Department of Chemical Engineering at the University of Illinois at Urbana–Champaign. Hammack earned his BS in Chemical Engineering in 1984 from Michigan Technological University.

Hammack is well known for his ventures in science communication as the persona Engineer Guy: between 1999 and 2005 he produced radio commentaries for Illinois Public Media, and starting in 2010, he produced a regular series of videos on YouTube explaining the engineering of everyday objects. He's also one of the authors of the book Eight Amazing Engineering Stories.

Awards
In 2002, Hammack was awarded the Edwin F. Church Medal. In 2019, he was awarded with the Carl Sagan Award for Public Appreciation of Science.

In 2022, Hammack was elected to the National Academy of Engineering.

References

External links

 Engineer Guy website
 Engineer Guy YouTube Channel

1961 births
Living people
American chemical engineers
University of Illinois Urbana-Champaign faculty
Jefferson Science Fellows
Fellows of the American Physical Society